Stade Poitevin Rugby is a French semi-professional rugby union team based in Poitiers. They currently play in Fédérale 3, the fifth division of the French rugby pyramid.

External links
Stade Poitevin Rugby Official Website (French)

Poitiers
Sport in Poitiers